The Great Powers ratified the terms of the Constantinople Arrangement in connection with the border between Greece and the Ottoman Empire in the London Protocol of 30 August 1832, which marked the end of the Greek War of Independence and established modern Greece as an independent state free of the Ottoman Empire. The Treaty of Constantinople was the product of the London Conference of 1832 which opened in February 1832 with the participation of the Great Powers (Britain, France and Russia) on the one hand and the Ottoman Empire on the other. The factors which shaped the treaty included the refusal of Leopold of Saxe-Coburg-Gotha to assume the Greek throne. He was not at all satisfied with the Aspropotamos–Spercheios line, which replaced the more favorable Arta–Volos line considered by the Great Powers earlier.

The withdrawal of Leopold as a candidate for the throne of Greece, and the July Revolution in France, delayed the final settlement of the frontiers of the new kingdom until a new government was formed in London. Lord Palmerston, who took over as British Foreign Secretary, agreed to the Arta-Volos borderline. However, the secret note on Crete, which the Bavarian plenipotentiary communicated to the Courts of Britain, France and Russia, bore no fruit.

Under the protocol signed on 7 May 1832 between Bavaria and the protecting Powers, and basically dealing with the way in which the Regency was to be managed until Otto reached his majority (while also concluding the second Greek loan, for a sum of £2,400,000 sterling), Greece was defined as an independent kingdom, with the Arta-Volos line as its northern frontier. The Ottoman Empire was indemnified in the sum of 40,000,000 piastres for the loss of the territory. The borders of the Kingdom were reiterated in the London Protocol of 30 August 1832 signed by the Great Powers, which ratified the terms of the Constantinople Arrangement in connection with the border between Greece and the Ottoman Empire and marked the end of the Greek War of Independence creating modern Greece as an independent state free of the Ottoman Empire.

See also
London Protocol (1832)
List of treaties
Treaty of Sèvres
Treaty of Lausanne

References

Sources
Treaty of Constantinople

Further reading
 Anderson, M.S. The Eastern Question, 1774-1923: A Study in International Relations (1966) online

History of modern Greece
Constantinople 1832
Diplomacy during the Greek War of Independence
Constantinople
19th century in Istanbul
Constantinople 1832
Constantinople 1832
Constantinople 1832
Constantinople 1832
1832 in Greece
1832 in the Ottoman Empire